Bongalo is a town on the island of Saint Lucia; it is located on the southern coast, near Balembouche and Piaye.

Towns in Saint Lucia